The Artsakh Freedom Party is an Armenian political party in Artsakh.

History
The Artsakh Freedom Party was established on 19 January 2020. Its founder and current party leader is Zaven Rubenyan. The party currently has no parliamentary representation within the National Assembly and acts as an extra-parliamentary force.

Zaven Rubenyan initially proclaimed that he would run for president in the 2020 Artsakhian general election. However, in February 2020, the party announced that it would endorse Arayik Harutyunyan for the presidency prior to the 2020 elections. The party also stated that it would cooperate with Harutyunyan's Free Motherland party, as well as, the Free Motherland - UCA Alliance.

Following the 2020 Nagorno-Karabakh war, the party opposed the 2020 Nagorno-Karabakh ceasefire agreement stating that the agreement undermines the territorial integrity of Artsakh while endangering the security of the people. The party also called for the resignation of Armenian Prime Minister Nikol Pashinyan.

Ideology
The party advocates for strengthening democracy and equality in Artsakh, while fighting corruption. The party also believes in the unification of Artsakh and Armenia, and the establishment of a United Armenia.

See also

List of political parties in Artsakh
Politics of Artsakh

References

External links
 Artsakh Freedom Party on Facebook

Political parties in the Republic of Artsakh
Political parties established in 2020